Showscan is a cinematic process developed by Douglas Trumbull that uses 70mm film photographed and projected at 60 frames per second, 2.5 times the standard speed of movie film.

History
Trumbull first came to the public's attention for his work on the groundbreaking special effects in movies such as 2001: A Space Odyssey and The Andromeda Strain. He also directed 1972's Silent Running.

Trumbull developed the Showscan film process in the late 1970s and early 1980s when he became interested in increasing the fidelity or definition of movies. Similar to the quality issues addressed later by high-definition television, the visual fidelity of movies was limited by the medium. When projected onto a large screen, the grain of 35 mm film stock is often quite visible, reducing the quality of the displayed image. The problem is further exacerbated by the larger grain in fast film stock often used to capture high-speed action. Trumbull chose 70 mm film for his new process, to provide higher resolution.

He also did research into frame rate, running a series of tests with 35 mm stock filmed and projected at various speeds, shown to audiences who were instrumented to biometrically test their responses. He found that as the frame rate increased, so did the viewer's emotional reaction.

Trumbull theorized that although viewers see smooth motion from film displayed at 24 frames per second, the standard for decades, they are subconsciously aware of the flicker, which reduces the film's emotional impact. Increasing the projection speed decreases the flicker.

In 1993, Trumbull, Geoffrey Williamson, Robert Auguste and Edmund DiGiulio received a Scientific and Engineering Academy Award for the Showscan camera system known as the CP-65.

Showscan Film Corporation, which produced and marketed the equipment, underwent Chapter 7 bankruptcy in 2002. The process was then acquired by a new company, Showscan Entertainment.

Uses
Trumbull produced a few short films to demonstrate this process, including “Night of the Dreams” and “New Magic.”

The 1983 feature film Brainstorm was intended to be the first Showscan feature, with the “normal” scenes in 35mm, and the virtual reality scenes in Showscan, but this plan proved too cumbersome. Instead, the virtual reality scenes ended up being shot in 70mm but at the standard 24 frames per second.

Since then, Showscan has been used mostly for short ride films in conjunction with powered motion simulator seats.

Archive
The Academy Film Archive houses the Showscan Collection, consisting of negatives and soundtrack elements for numerous short films created for World's Fair expositions, special venue attractions, and motion-based simulator rides.

See also
 Slit-scan photography

References

External links
 Showscan Entertainment
 List of Showscan films
 Great Frame Rate Debate featuring Doug Trumbull

Film and video technology
Motion picture film formats
Cinematography
Movie cameras
70 mm film